Filipino Japanese or Japanese Filipino may refer to:hhik
 Japan–Philippines relations
 Filipinos in Japan
 Japanese settlement in the Philippines
 Japanese occupation of the Philippines